Richland Northeast High School is a public high school in Columbia, South Carolina. Richland Northeast, often abbreviated as RNE, RNH, or RNHS, was founded in 1978 to handle the excessive population of students at Spring Valley High School.  Spring Valley is now Richland Northeast's largest rival in sporting events.  Richland Northeast is one of five high schools in Richland County School District 2 (RSD2).

Service area
Richland Northeast is the zoned high school for dependent children living on the grounds of Fort Jackson.

Demographics

Student diversity
RNE is 66 percent black, 22 percent white, 8 percent Hispanic, 2 percent Asian, and 1 percent two or more races.

54% of students participate in a free or reduced-price lunch program.

Magnet programs 
Richland Northeast is home to four magnet programs:

 Horizon (academic)
 CavPlex-Convergence Media (multimedia)
 Palmetto Center for the Arts (PCA)
 International Baccalaureate

CavPlex-Convergence Media 
Beginning in the 2015–2016 school year, iLink will merge with Convergence Media and become iMedia.
A merger between Convergence Media and former program iLink was planned for the 2015–16 school year, but did not go through and resulted in the dissolution of the iLink program. Convergence Media is functioning as before.

Palmetto Center for the Arts 
The Palmetto Center for the Arts (PCA) received the John F. Kennedy Center Creative Ticket award for outstanding achievement in arts education. It includes dance, music, theater, and visual arts. All PCA students are enrolled in the International Baccalaureate Programme. Students who wish to join must have at least a C average. Students may audition for as many programs as they want, but they can only get accepted into one.

International Baccalaureate 
In the Fall of 2012, Richland Northeast opened its doors as a new member of the International Baccalaureate Program, which is phasing out the Advanced Placement program.

Activities

Athletics 
Richland Northeast High School is known as the Cavalier. They share a region in SCHSL Class 4A Upper State with South Pointe, Westwood, Ridge View, Lancaster, and York. They participate in many athletic programs, fielding teams in the following sports:
 Football
 Volleyball
 Tennis (Boys' and Girls')
 Cross-country
 Soccer (Boys' and Girls')
 Basketball (Boys' and Girls')
 Wrestling
 Swimming
 Softball
 Baseball
 Track and Field
 Indoor track
 Golf (Girls' and Boys')

Model UN 
Richland Northeast's Model UN team is notable for winning the Award of Distinction (a first-place equivalent) at the National High School Model UN Conference in New York for 30 years.

Notable alumni 
 Beth Bernstein – Democratic state representative, representing the 78th District of South Carolina.
 T. J. Brunson – an American football linebacker for the New York Giants of the National Football League (NFL). He played college football at South Carolina.
 Danny! – recording artist for Okayplayer Records and music producer/composer for MTV's Hype Music production library
 Michael Kratsios – Chief Technology Officer of the United States under President Donald Trump
 Joel Lourie – Democratic member of the South Carolina Senate, representing the 22nd District from 2004 to 2017.
 Leroy Miller – Musician, songwriter, record producer
 Greg Alia – Forest Acres, South Carolina police officer killed in the line of duty and whose widow founded the South Carolina charity Serve & Connect.
 Pi'erre Bourne – Record producer, rapper, and audio engineer

References

External links
 http://rncavaliers.com/

Educational institutions established in 1978
Public high schools in South Carolina
Schools in Columbia, South Carolina
Magnet schools in South Carolina
International Baccalaureate schools in South Carolina